Giovanni Raimondo Torlonia (May 1755 – February 25, 1829) was a famous Franco-Italian banker to the Vatican and noble of the Torlonia family.

In 1785 he inherited the fortune of his father Marino Torlonia (1725–1785; in early life Marin Torlonias, of Augerolles, France), who had become a successful businessman and banker in Rome. As a reward for the administration of the Vatican finances, in 1794 Pope Pius VI created Giovanni Torlonia Duke of Bracciano and Count of Pisciarelli; in 1803 Pope Pius VII further created him Marquis of Romavecchia and Turrita and 1st Prince (Princeps Romanus) of Civitella Cesi; in 1809 he was elevated to Patrician (with confirmation of that honor by Pius VII on January 19, 1813) and in 1820 became Duke of Poli and Guadagnolo, with other titles.

He was the builder of the Villa Torlonia in Rome (started 1806), as well as other Torlonia villas.

In 1793 he married Anna Maria Schultheiss (1760–1840), and they had five children:
Maria Teresa (born 1794)
Marino (1796–1860) who in 1847 became Duca di Poli e di Guadagnolo
Carlo (1798–1848),
Alessandro Torlonia, 2nd Prince of Civitella-Cesi (1800–1886), who inherited his fathers princely title in 1829,
Maria Luisa (1804–1883).
By his son Marino, Giovanni Raimondo Torlonia is an ancestor of the American actress Brooke Shields.

References

Italian bankers
G
Giovanni
Businesspeople from Rome
18th-century Italian people
19th-century Italian people
Italian people of French descent
1755 births
1829 deaths
18th-century Italian businesspeople
19th-century Italian businesspeople